John Abbot (fl. 1379–1414) was an English politician who served as Member of Parliament for Melcombe Regis in 1393 and mayor of Melcombe Regis from September 1399 until 1400. By 1379 Abbot owned property in Melcombe, which later included a house in St. Mary Street. Three of his sons , John, Robert, and William, were also MPs .

References

English MPs 1393
Members of the Parliament of England (pre-1707) for Melcombe Regis
Mayors of places in Dorset
Year of birth unknown
Year of death unknown